Penicillium pseudostromaticum is an anamorph species of fungus in the genus Penicillium which was isolated from the mushroom Piptoporus betulinus which grew on the tree Betula populifolia.

References

Further reading 
 
 

pseudostromaticum
Fungi described in 1970